George Margo (1915 – 2002) was an American actor who appeared mainly in British films and television shows.

Selected filmography
 Circle of Danger (1951) - Sim (uncredited)
 Hell Is Sold Out (1951) - American Soldier at Cafe
 The Red Beret (1953) - American Crewman
 The Saint's Return (1953) - Lennar's Henchman
 Radio Cab Murder (1954) - Man in the taxi (uncredited)
 Lilacs in the Spring (1954) - Reporter
 Little Red Monkey (1955) - American Sailor (uncredited)
 Joe MacBeth (1955) - Second Assassin 
 Who Done It? (1956) - Barakov
 A Touch of the Sun (1956) - Howard Cann
 Zarak (1956) - Chief jailer
 The Key Man (1957) - Jeff, Photographer
 After the Ball (1957) - Tony Pastor
 Windom's Way (1957) - Police Officer Lansang
 Mark of the Phoenix (1958) - Emilson
 Make Mine a Million (1959) - Assistant
 The Mouse That Roared (1959) - O'Hara (uncredited)
 The Adding Machine (1969) - Gateman
 The Revolutionary (1970)
 Captain Apache (1971) - Sheriff

References

External links

1915 births
2002 deaths
Male actors from New York City
American expatriate male actors in the United Kingdom